Yaldhurst is a former New Zealand parliamentary electorate, near the city of Christchurch. The electorate was to the southwest of Christchurch, and was suburban and semi-rural.

Population centres
The 1977 electoral redistribution was the most overtly political since the Representation Commission had been established through an amendment to the Representation Act in 1886, initiated by Muldoon's National Government. As part of the 1976 census, a large number of people failed to fill out an electoral re-registration card, and census staff had not been given the authority to insist on the card being completed. This had little practical effect for people on the general roll, but it transferred Māori to the general roll if the card was not handed in. Together with a northward shift of New Zealand's population, this resulted in five new electorates having to be created in the upper part of the North Island. The electoral redistribution was very disruptive, and 22 electorates were abolished, while 27 electorates were newly created (including Yaldhurst) or re-established.

The  electorate was abolished through the 1977 electoral redistribution and its northern part made up much of the area of the new Yaldhurst electorate. Christchurch suburbs located in the Yaldhurst electorate included Burnside, Avonhead, Russley, Broomfield, Hei Hei, Yaldhurst, and parts of Hornby.

History
In the 1978 election, the Yaldhurst electorate was won by Mick Connelly of the Labour Party, who had been MP for the Wigram electorate since , and the Riccarton electorate prior to that since 1956. In 1995, Austin defected to United New Zealand prior to the first mixed-member proportional (MMP) election. When the electorate was abolished in 1996, Austin stood in the new  electorate where she came third.

Members of Parliament
Key

Election results

1993 election

1990 election

1987 election

1984 election

1981 election

1978 election

Notes

References

1978 establishments in New Zealand
1996 disestablishments in New Zealand
Historical electorates of New Zealand
Politics of Christchurch
History of Christchurch